Hulme is a surname. Notable people with the surname include:

 Alan Hulme (1907–1989), Australian politician
 Alfred Hulme (1911–1982), New Zealand recipient of the Victoria Cross
 Arthur Hulme (1877–1916), English footballer
 Darren Hulme (born 1977), Australian rules footballer
 David Hulme (rugby league) (born 1964), British rugby league footballer
 David Russell Hulme (born 1951), Welsh conductor and musicologist
 Denny Hulme (1936–1992), New Zealand car racer, F1 world champion
 Edward Hulme (1812-1876), surgeon and hospital administrator in New Zealand
 Etta Hulme (1923–2014), American editorial cartoonist
 F. Edward Hulme (1841–1909), English artist and botanist
 Fred Hulme, English rugby league footballer of the 1950s
 Joe Hulme (1904–1991), English footballer and cricketer
 John Hulme (Derbyshire cricketer) (1862–1940), English cricketer
 John Hulme (Shropshire cricketer) (born 1950), Welsh cricketer
 John Hulme (author) (born 1969), American children's writer and film director
 Anne Perry (born 1938 as Juliet Hulme), English author of historical detective fiction
 Kathryn Hulme (1900–1981), American novelist
 Keri Hulme (1947–2021), New Zealand writer
 Lachy Hulme (born 1971), Australian film actor
 T. E. Hulme (1883–1917), English writer
 W. Wilson Hulme II (1946–2007), American Curator of the National Postal Museum
 William Hulme (circa 1631–1691), English lawyer
 William Hulme (British Army officer) (died 1855), Manchester Regiment officer

English-language surnames